Riggs National Bank is a historic former headquarters of Riggs Bank, located at 1503–1505 Pennsylvania Avenue, Northwest, Washington, D.C., in the downtown Washington, D.C. neighborhood.

It was designed by architects York and Sawyer in 1899, completed in 1902, and is an example of Classical Revival architecture. 
Between 1922 and 1924, a west office wing designed by Appleton P. Clark Jr. was added.

Riggs National Bank was listed on the National Register of Historic Places in 1973; in addition, the building is a contributing property to the Fifteenth Street Financial Historic District and the Lafayette Square Historic District.

See also
Riggs National Bank, Washington Loan and Trust Company Branch, also NRHP-listed in Washington, D.C.

References

External links

 Historic photo, via the Smithsonian Institution

Bank buildings on the National Register of Historic Places in Washington, D.C.
Commercial buildings completed in 1902
Neoclassical architecture in Washington, D.C.
Individually listed contributing properties to historic districts on the National Register in Washington, D.C.
Riggs family